Sebastiano Mazzoni (c. 1611 - Venice, 22 April 1678) was an Italian painter of the Baroque period. 

Born in Florence, he trained in that city during 1632-33 in the studio of Baccio del Bianco. He then moved to Venice in 1648, and stayed there till his death. He painted a somewhat unusual Annunciation with a hovering ghostly angel dominating the scene. In 1638 he joined the Accademia del Disegno in Florence. Andrea Celesti was one of his pupils; and it is said he influenced the style of Sebastiano Ricci and Ghislandi. Ultimately he has an enigmatic individual style with paintings of unresolved dynamism, depicted from awkward perspectives, in some fashion he resembles his contemporary Francesco Maffei or evokes the distortions of a Lorenzo Lotto of the prior century.

Sources
Grove Encyclopedia entry in Artnet.
Web Gallery of Art entry.

Partial anthology
Death of Cleopatra
 Vulcan surprises Venus and Mars

External links

1610s births
1678 deaths
17th-century Italian painters
Italian male painters
Painters from Venice
Painters from Florence
Italian Baroque painters